This is the order of battle for the Syria–Lebanon campaign, a World War II campaign between the Western Allies and Vichy France during June and July, 1941.

Allied forces

Commander-in-Chief Middle East Command: General Sir Archibald WavellGeneral Officer Commanding Palestine and Trans-Jordan: General Sir H. Maitland Wilson

South Syria and Lebanon – Australian I Corps (from 18 June)

General Officer Commanding I Corps: Lieutenant-General John Lavarack
 Australian 7th Division – Major-General John Lavarack (until 18 June) then Major-General Arthur "Tubby" Allen
 Divisional Troops
 6th Division Cavalry
 9th Division Cavalry
 2/3rd Machine Gun Battalion
 The Royal Scots Greys and The Staffordshire Yeomanry (composite mechanised regiment detached from British 1st Cavalry Division)
 One squadron, The Royals (detached from 1st Cavalry Division )
 C battalion Special Service Brigade (commandos based in Cyprus for seaborne landings)
 Artillery (Brigadier F. H. Berryman)
 2/4th Field Regiment
 2/5th Field Regiment
 2/6th Field Regiment
 2/2nd Anti-tank Regiment
 57 Light Anti-aircraft Regiment
 21st Australian Brigade (Brigadier J E S Stevens)
 2/14th Infantry Battalion
 2/16th Infantry Battalion
 2/27th Infantry Battalion
 25th Australian Brigade (Brigadier A. R. Baxter-Cox until 22 June, Brigadier E.C.P. Plant thereafter))
 2/25th Infantry Battalion
 2/31st Infantry Battalion
 2/33rd Infantry Battalion
 17th Australian Brigade (from 28 June) (Brigadier S. G. Savige)
 2/3rd Infantry Battalion
 2/5th Infantry Battalion
 2/2nd Pioneer Battalion
 'Gentforce' (command activated 12 June until 18 June) – Major-General P L Legentilhomme (wounded 12 June and succeeded by Brigadier W. L. Lloyd until 18 June)
 British 6th Infantry Division (activated 18 June) – Major-General J. F. Evetts
 British 16th Infantry Brigade (Brigadier C. E. N. Lomax) from 20 June
 2nd Battalion, King's Own Royal Regiment
 2nd Battalion, Leicestershire Regiment
 2nd Battalion, Queen's Royal Regiment
 British 23rd Infantry Brigade (Brigadier A. Galloway) from 29 June
 1st Battalion, Durham Light Infantry
 Czechoslovak 11th Infantry Battalion
 4th Battalion, Border Regiment
 5th Indian Infantry Brigade (Brigadier W L Lloyd) (Lieut.-Col. L. B. Jones of 4/6th Rajputana Rifles while Lloyd commanded Gentforce)
 1st Battalion, Royal Fusiliers
 3/1st Punjab Regiment
 4/6th Rajputana Rifles
 18th Field Company Bombay Sappers and Miners
 1st Field Regiment, Royal Artillery
 1st Free French Light Division – Major-General Paul Legentilhomme
 1st Free French Brigade (Colonel Cazaud)
 1st Battalion of Foreign Legion
 1 March Battalion
 3 March Battalion
 2nd Free French Brigade (Colonel Genin)
 1st Battalion of Marine infantry
 2 March Battalion
 4 March Battalion
 1st battalion of Naval Fusiliers
 1st Moroccan Spahis group of squadron
 1st battery field artillery (4 75 mm guns)
 1st company of tanks (9 H39 tanks)
 Circassian Cavalry group of squadrons (453 troops) (Colonel Collet)

Northern Syria
Elements of Iraqforce:

Advancing on the Euphrates
 10th Indian Infantry Division – Major-General W J Slim
 13th Duke of Connaught's Own Lancers
 157th Field Regiment RA
 21st Indian Infantry Brigade (Brigadier C.J. Weld)
 2/10th Gurkha Rifles
 2/4th Gurkha Rifles
 4/13th Frontier Force Rifles
 25th Indian Infantry Brigade (Brigadier R Mountain)
 1/5th Mahratta Light Infantry
 2/11th Sikh Regiment
 3/9th Jat Regiment
 2/8th Gurkha Rifles (detached from 20th Indian Infantry Brigade)

In northern Iraq and the "Duck's Bill" region of Syria
Under command of HQ British Troops Iraq: Lieutenant-General Sir Edward Quinan
 20th Indian Infantry Brigade (detached from 10th Indian Infantry Division) (Brigadier D Powell)
 2/7th Gurkha Rifles
 3/11th Sikh Regiment
 17th Indian Infantry Brigade (detached from 8th Indian Infantry Division) (Brigadier Douglas Gracey)
 1/12th Frontier Force Regiment
 5/13th Frontier Force Rifles

In central Syria
 Habforce commanded by Major-General J.G.W. Clark
 British 4th Cavalry Brigade of the British 1st Cavalry Division (Brigadier J.J. Kingstone until 24 June, Brigadier J G E Tiarks from 29 June)
 Household Cavalry Regiment
 North Somerset Yeomanry
 Royal Wiltshire Yeomanry
 1st Battalion of the Essex Regiment
 Arab Legion Mechanised Regiment
 237th Battery, Royal Artillery (60th Field Regiment)
 An Australian battery of 2-pounder anti-tank guns (detached from the 2/1st Anti-Tank Regiment)
 169th Light Anti-aircraft Battery

Vichy French forces

The Army of the Levant (Armée du Levant) identifies the armed forces of France and then Vichy France which occupied a portion of the "Levant" during the "interwar period" and early World War II.  In 1920, the French were given a mandate over Syria and Lebanon by the League of Nations.  During this period of time, Syria was known as the French Mandate of Syria and Lebanon was known as the French Mandate of Lebanon.
 South Lebanon Sector
 Saïda Sub-Sector
 III/22nd Algerian Tirailleur Regiment
 I/Colonial Artillery Regiment of the Levant
 I/8th Algerian Spahi Regiment
 II/22nd Algerian Tirailleur Regiment
 I/29th Algerian Tirailleur Regiment
 I/6th African Chasseur Regiment
 IV/6th Foreign Legion Regiment
 I/24th Mixed Colonial Infantry Regiment
 Foreign Legion Levant Artillery Battalion
 Merdjayoun Sub-Sector
 II/29th Algerian Tirailleur Regiment
 I/22nd Algerian Tirailleur Regiment
 1st Lebanese Chasseur Battalion
 II/Colonial Artillery Regiment of the Levant
 South Syria Sector
 Direct sector control
 1st Metropolitan Artillery Regiment of the Levant
 III/17th Senegalese Tirailleur Regiment
 Hauran Sub-Sector
 II/17th Senegalese Tirailleur Regiment
 L'Hermon Sub-Sector
 I/17th Senegalese Tirailleur Regiment
 Sector Reserve
 V/1st Moroccan Tirailleur Regiment
 III/29th Algerian Tirailleur Regiment
 I/16th Tunisian Tirailleur Regiment
 III/16th Tunisian Tirailleur Regiment
 II/24th Mixed Colonial Infantry Regiment
 III/24th Mixed Colonial Infantry Regiment
 Levant Cavalry
 1st Moroccan Spahi Regiment
 2nd March (provisional) Spahi Regiment
 6th African Chasseur Regiment
 7th African Chasseur Regiment
 Special Cavalry (Three companies of Méhariste, two companies of Druze, eight various companies stationed in Syria, and 20 companies of Circassians)
 Forces in central Lebanon, mid- to late-June 1941
 Task Force Albord
 I/22nd Algerian Tirailleur Regiment
 II/29th Algerian Tirailleur Regiment
 1st Lebanese Chasseur Battalion
 III/6th Foreign Legion Regiment
 II/16th Tunisian Tirailleur Regiment
 Task Force Barré
 I/6th Foreign Legion Regiment
 II/17th Senegalese Tirailleur Regiment
 III/17th Senegalese Tirailleur Regiment
 Alep Special Artillery Battalion
 Spahi Cavalry Battalion
 Lehr-Olive Detachments
 I/6th African Chasseur Regiment
 II/24th Colonial Infantry Mixed Regiment
 Task Force Rougie
 II/16th Tunisian Tirailleur Regiment, later replaced by the II/22nd Algerian Tirailleur Regiment
 II/6th Foreign Legion Regiment

Footnotes

Sources

 
 
 
 
 
 
 
 

Campaigns, operations and battles of World War II involving the United Kingdom
Order of battle
Order of battle
World War II orders of battle